A buckling is a form of hot-smoked herring similar to the kipper and the bloater. The head and guts are removed but the roe or milt remain. They may be eaten hot or cold.

Origin
The word may come from the German Bückling or the Swedish böckling, both words denoting a hot-smoked variety of the kipper.

Bucklings, bloaters and kippers
All three are types of smoked herring. Buckling is hot-smoked whole; bloaters are cold-smoked whole; kippers are split and gutted, and then cold-smoked.

See also

 List of smoked foods

References

External links
Herring page

Fish processing
Food preservation
Oily fish
Smoked fish
Herring dishes
British seafood dishes